The 2017 United Kingdom Championship Tournament was a two-day professional wrestling streaming event and tournament promoted by the American promotion WWE. It aired exclusively on the WWE Network. The first round took place on 14 January 2017, while the finals occurred on 15 January. The tournament was held at the Empress Ballroom in Blackpool, Lancashire, England and crowned the inaugural WWE United Kingdom Champion. Tyler Bate won the tournament to become the inaugural champion.

Background
In a press conference at The O2 Arena on 15 December 2016,  Triple H, an executive for the American professional wrestling promotion WWE and head of the promotion's NXT brand, revealed that there would be a 16-man tournament to crown the inaugural WWE United Kingdom Champion. A United Kingdom Championship Tournament: Preview show aired on the WWE Network on 9 January 2017, with a behind-the-scenes look at the creators of the event and the 16 competitors. The tournament was held over a two-day period, 14 and 15 January 2017, at the Empress Ballroom in Blackpool, Lancashire, England and aired exclusively on the WWE Network. The championship later became the top championship of the NXT UK brand and its show, NXT UK, a WWE Network show produced in the United Kingdom that premiered on 17 October 2018.

Participants

Alternates
These competitors were initially announced for the tournament, but were not selected as part of the final 16. They were backup competitors if there were any injuries to the final 16, which there were not.

Results

14 January

15 January

Tournament bracket 
On 9 January 2017, WWE.com announced the full bracket for the tournament.

The following time limits were in place:
 Round one: 15 minutes
 Quarterfinals: 20 minutes
 Semifinals: 30 minutes
 Final: no time limit

Broadcast team

Aftermath
On 15 May 2017, a follow-up to the United Kingdom Championship tournament was announced by WWE, titled the United Kingdom Championship Special, the event aired on 19 May 2017. In April 2018, a second WWE United Kingdom Championship Tournament was announced, to be held on 18 and 19 June 2018 at the Royal Albert Hall.

See also
Professional wrestling in the United Kingdom

References

External links 

2017 WWE Network events
January 2017 events in the United Kingdom
2017
Tournament 2017
2017 in England
Blackpool
WWE international